Harold Thayer Davis (5 October 1892, in Beatrice, Nebraska – 14 November 1974, in Bloomington, Indiana) was a mathematician, statistician, and econometrician, known for the Davis distribution.

Davis received in 1915 his A.B. from Colorado College, in 1919 his A.M. from Harvard University, and in 1926 his PhD under Edward Burr Van Vleck from the University of Wisconsin, after working there as a mathematics instructor from 1920 to 1923. From 1923 to 1937 he taught mathematics at the Indiana University Bloomington, becoming a professor there. From February to August 1937 he was acting research director of the Cowles Commission. Davis became a professor in 1937 at Northwestern University in the mathematics department and the chair of the department in 1942. He was the author of many articles in refereed journals and numerous books and monographs.

Davis was an associate editor of Econometrica, Isis, and the Bulletin of the American Mathematical Society. He was elected a Fellow the Econometric Society.

Selected publications

Articles

Books

 ; 
with F. C. Nelson:

References

1892 births
1974 deaths
20th-century American economists
20th-century American mathematicians
American statisticians
Econometricians
Colorado College alumni
Harvard University alumni
University of Wisconsin–Madison alumni
Indiana University faculty
Northwestern University faculty
Fellows of the Econometric Society
People from Beatrice, Nebraska
Writers from Indiana
Writers from Nebraska
Economists from Nebraska
American textbook writers